An open university is a university with an open-door academic policy.

Open university may also refer to specific organizations:
The Open University (OU), a public distance-learning and research university based in the United Kingdom
 Open University of Diversity, headquarters of Belgian artist Koen Vanmechelen
 Open University Press, an academic publisher now owned by McGraw-Hill Education
 Sex Worker Open University, a project created by and for sex workers in the United Kingdom

See also
 List of open universities